Luther Buxton (October 12, 1822 – August 23, 1897) was an American physician and politician.

Born in Danby, Rutland County, Vermont, Buxton graduated from Castleton University and Albany Medical College. In 1849, Buxton served in the New York State Assembly, from Brant, New York, was a physician, and was a Whig. Buxton then moved to Oshkosh, Wisconsin where  he continued to practice medicine. In 1860, he was elected superintendent of public instruction. In 1868 and 1869, Buxton served in the Wisconsin State Assembly as a Republican. He was also deputy collector on internal revenue. He moved to Milwaukee, Wisconsin where he died from cancer.

Notes

External links

1822 births
1897 deaths
People from Erie County, New York
People from Danby, Vermont
Politicians from Milwaukee
Politicians from Oshkosh, Wisconsin
Albany Medical College alumni
Castleton State College alumni
Physicians from New York (state)
Physicians from Wisconsin
New York (state) Whigs
19th-century American politicians
Members of the New York State Assembly
Republican Party members of the Wisconsin State Assembly